Dichomeris acritopa is a moth of the family Gelechiidae. It was described by Edward Meyrick in 1935. It is known from the Chinese provinces of Shanxi, Shaanxi, Zhejiang and Yunnan.

References

acritopa
Moths described in 1935